Technika, meaning technology in several Slavic languages, may refer to:

Technika (brand), a brand of electronic products from Tesco
Technika (publisher), a publishing house of Vilnius Gediminas Technical University
Technika (camera), an all-metal folding field camera from Linhof
TECHNIKA, an annual technical festival held at the Birla Institute of Technology

It may also refer to:

DJ Max Technika, is an arcade music game published and developed by Pentavision
DJ Max Technika 2, the sequel to DJ Max Technika
DJ Max Technika 3, the sequel to DJ Max Technika 2